Levi B. Gaylord (September 23, 1840 – December 6, 1900) was an American soldier who fought in the American Civil War. Gaylord received his country's highest award for bravery during combat, the Medal of Honor. Gaylord's medal was won for his actions during the Battle of Fort Stedman in Petersburg, Virginia on March 25, 1865. He was honored with the award on June 22, 1896.

Gaylord joined the Army from Boston in April 1861, and mustered out with his regiment in July 1865. He was buried in Cohasset, Massachusetts.

Medal of Honor citation

See also
List of American Civil War Medal of Honor recipients: G–L

References

1840 births
1900 deaths
American Civil War recipients of the Medal of Honor
People from Boston
People from Cohasset, Massachusetts
People of Massachusetts in the American Civil War
Union Army officers
United States Army Medal of Honor recipients